The 2003–04 season was the 82nd season in the existence of Deportivo Alavés and the club's first season back in the second division of Spanish football. In addition to the domestic league, Alavés participated in this season's edition of the Copa del Rey. The season covered the period from 1 July 2003 to 30 June 2004.

Players

First-team squad

Transfers

In

Out

Competitions

Overview

Segunda División

League table

Results summary

Results by round

Matches

Source:

Copa del Rey

Statistics

Appearances and goals

Goalscorers

Notes

References

Deportivo Alavés seasons
Deportivo Alavés